

Events

Pre-1600
 655 – Battle of the Winwaed: Penda of Mercia is defeated by Oswiu of Northumbria.
1315 – Growth of the Old Swiss Confederacy: The Schweizer Eidgenossenschaft ambushes the army of Leopold I in the Battle of Morgarten.
1532 – Spanish conquest of the Inca Empire: Commanded by Francisco Pizarro, Spanish conquistadors under Hernando de Soto meet Incan Emperor Atahualpa for the first time outside Cajamarca, arranging for a meeting in the city plaza the following day.
1533 – Francisco Pizarro arrives in Cuzco, the capital of the Inca Empire.

1601–1900
1705 – Rákóczi's War of Independence: The Habsburg Empire and Denmark win a military victory over the Kurucs from Hungary in the Battle of Zsibó. 
1760 – The secondly-built Castellania in Valletta is officially inaugurated with the blessing of the interior Chapel of Sorrows.
1777 – American Revolutionary War: After 16 months of debate the Continental Congress approves the Articles of Confederation.
1806 – Pike Expedition: Lieutenant Zebulon Pike spots a mountain peak while near the Colorado foothills of the Rocky Mountains. It is later named Pikes Peak in his honor.
1864 – American Civil War: Union General William Tecumseh Sherman begins his March to the Sea.
1889 – Brazil is declared a republic by Marshal Deodoro da Fonseca as Emperor Pedro II is deposed in a military coup.

1901–present
1917 – Eduskunta declares itself the supreme state power of Finland, prompting its declaration of independence and secession from Russia.
1920 – The first assembly of the League of Nations is held in Geneva, Switzerland.
  1920   – The Free City of Danzig is established.
1922 – At least 300 are massacred during a general strike in Guayaquil, Ecuador.
1926 – The NBC Radio Network opens with 24 stations.
1928 – The RNLI lifeboat Mary Stanford capsized in Rye Harbour with the loss of the entire 17-man crew.
1933 – Thailand held its first election.
1938 – Nazi Germany bans Jewish children from public schools in the aftermath of Kristallnacht. 
1939 – In Washington, D.C., U.S. President Franklin D. Roosevelt lays the cornerstone of the Jefferson Memorial.
1942 – World War II: The Battle of Guadalcanal ends in a decisive Allied victory.
1943 – The Holocaust: German SS leader Heinrich Himmler orders that Gypsies are to be put "on the same level as Jews and placed in concentration camps".
1951 – Greek resistance leader Nikos Beloyannis, along with 11 other resistance members, is sentenced to death by the court-martial.
1955 – The first part of the Saint Petersburg Metro is opened.
1965 – Craig Breedlove sets a land speed record of 600.601 mph (966.574 km/h) in his car, the Spirit of America, at the Bonneville Salt Flats in Utah.
1966 – Project Gemini: Gemini 12 completes the program's final mission, when it splashes down safely in the Atlantic Ocean.
  1966   – Pan Am Flight 708 crashes near Dallgow-Döberitz, East Germany, killing all three people on board.
1967 – The only fatality of the North American X-15 program occurs during the 191st flight when Air Force test pilot Michael J. Adams loses control of his aircraft which is destroyed mid-air over the Mojave Desert.
1968 – The Cleveland Transit System becomes the first transit system in the western hemisphere to provide direct rapid transit service from a city's downtown to its major airport.
1969 – Cold War: The Soviet submarine K-19 collides with the American submarine USS Gato in the Barents Sea.
  1969   – Vietnam War: In Washington, D.C., 250,000-500,000 protesters staged a peaceful demonstration against the war, including a symbolic "March Against Death".
1971 – Intel releases the world's first commercial single-chip microprocessor, the 4004.
1976 – René Lévesque and the Parti Québécois take power to become the first Quebec government of the 20th century clearly in favor of independence.
1978 – A chartered Douglas DC-8 crashes near Colombo, Sri Lanka, killing 183.
1979 – A package from Unabomber Ted Kaczynski begins smoking in the cargo hold of a flight from Chicago to Washington, D.C., forcing the plane to make an emergency landing.
1983 – Turkish Republic of Northern Cyprus declares independence; it is only recognized by Turkey.
1985 – A research assistant is injured when a package from the Unabomber addressed to a University of Michigan professor explodes.
  1985   – The Anglo-Irish Agreement is signed at Hillsborough Castle by British Prime Minister Margaret Thatcher and Irish Taoiseach Garret FitzGerald.
1987 – In Brașov, Romania, workers rebel against the communist regime of Nicolae Ceaușescu.
1988 – In the Soviet Union, the uncrewed Shuttle Buran makes its only space flight.
  1988   – Israeli–Palestinian conflict: An independent State of Palestine is proclaimed by the Palestinian National Council.
  1988   – The first Fairtrade label, Max Havelaar, is launched in the Netherlands.
1990 – The Communist People's Republic of Bulgaria is disestablished and a new republican government is instituted.
2000 – A chartered Antonov An-24 crashes after takeoff from Luanda, Angola, killing more than 40 people.
  2000   – Jharkhand officially becomes the 28th state of India, formed from eighteen districts of southern Bihar.
2001 – Microsoft launches the Xbox game console.
2002 – Hu Jintao becomes General Secretary of the Chinese Communist Party and a new nine-member Politburo Standing Committee is inaugurated.
2003 – The first day of the 2003 Istanbul bombings, in which two car bombs, targeting two synagogues, explode, kill 25 people and wound 300 more.
2006 – Al Jazeera English launches worldwide.
2007 – Cyclone Sidr hits Bangladesh, killing an estimated 5,000 people and destroying parts of the world's largest mangrove forest, the Sundarbans.
2012 – Xi Jinping becomes General Secretary of the Chinese Communist Party and a new seven-member Politburo Standing Committee is inaugurated.
2013 – Sony releases the PlayStation 4 (PS4) game console.
2016 – Hong Kong's High Court bans elected politicians Yau Wai-ching and Baggio Leung from the city's Parliament.
2020 – Lewis Hamilton wins the Turkish Grand Prix and secures his seventh drivers' title, equalling the all-time record held by Michael Schumacher.

Births

Pre-1600
 459 – B'utz Aj Sak Chiik, Mayan king (d. 501)
1316 – John I, king of France and Navarre (d. 1316)
1397 – Nicholas V, pope of the Catholic Church (d. 1455)
1498 – Eleanor of Austria, queen of Portugal and France (d. 1558)
1511 – Johannes Secundus, Dutch poet and author (d. 1536)
1556 – Jacques Davy Duperron, French cardinal (d. 1618)

1601–1900
1607 – Madeleine de Scudéry, French author (d. 1701)
1660 – Hermann von der Hardt, German historian and orientalist (d. 1746)
1661 – Christoph von Graffenried, Swiss-American settler and author (d. 1743)
1692 – Eusebius Amort, German poet and theologian (d. 1775)
1708 – William Pitt, 1st Earl of Chatham, English soldier and politician, Prime Minister of the United Kingdom (d. 1778)
1738 – William Herschel, German-English astronomer and composer (d. 1822)
1741 – Johann Kaspar Lavater, Swiss poet and physiognomist (d. 1801)
1746 – Joseph Quesnel, French-Canadian poet, playwright, and composer (d. 1809)
1757 – Heinrich Christian Friedrich Schumacher, Danish surgeon, botanist, and academic (d. 1830)
1776 – José Joaquín Fernández de Lizardi, Mexican journalist and author (d. 1827)
1784 – Jérôme Bonaparte, French husband of Catharina of Württemberg (d. 1860)
1791 – Friedrich Ernst Scheller, German lawyer, jurist, and politician (d. 1869)
1793 – Michel Chasles, French mathematician and academic (d. 1880)
1849 – Mary E. Byrd, American astronomer and educator (d. 1934)
1852 – Tewfik Pasha, Egyptian ruler (d. 1892)
1859 – Christopher Hornsrud, Norwegian businessman and politician, 11th Prime Minister of Norway (d. 1960)
1862 – Gerhart Hauptmann, German novelist, poet, and playwright, Nobel Prize laureate (d. 1946)
1865 – John Earle, Australian politician, 22nd Premier of Tasmania (d. 1932)
1866 – Cornelia Sorabji, Indian lawyer, social reformer and writer (d. 1954)
1867 – Emil Krebs, German polyglot (d. 1930)
1868 – Emil Racoviță, Romanian biologist, zoologist, and explorer (d. 1947)
1873 – Sara Josephine Baker, American physician and academic (d. 1945)
1874 – Dimitrios Golemis, Greek runner (d. 1941)
  1874   – August Krogh, Danish zoologist and physiologist, Nobel Prize laureate (d. 1949)
1879 – Lewis Stone, American actor (d. 1953)
1881 – Franklin Pierce Adams, American journalist and author (d. 1960)
1882 – Felix Frankfurter, Austrian-American lawyer and jurist (d. 1965)
1886 – René Guénon, French-Egyptian philosopher and author (d. 1951)
1887 – Marianne Moore, American poet, critic, and translator (d. 1972)
  1887   – Georgia O'Keeffe, American painter and educator (d. 1986)
1888 – Artie Matthews, American pianist and composer (d. 1958)
1890 – Richmal Crompton, English author and educator (d. 1969)
1891 – W. Averell Harriman, American businessman and politician, 11th United States Secretary of Commerce (d. 1986)
  1891   – Erwin Rommel, German field marshal (d. 1944)
1892 – Naomi Childers, American actress (d. 1964)
1895 – Grand Duchess Olga Nikolaevna of Russia (d. 1918)
  1895   – Antoni Słonimski, Polish journalist, poet, and playwright (d. 1976)
1896 – Leonard Lord, English businessman (d. 1967)
1897 – Aneurin Bevan, Welsh journalist and politician, Secretary of State for Health (d. 1960)
  1897   – Sacheverell Sitwell, English author and critic (d. 1988)
1899 – Avdy Andresson, Estonian-American soldier and diplomat, Estonian Minister of War (d. 1990)

1901–present
1903 – Stewie Dempster, New Zealand cricketer and coach (d. 1974)
1905 – Mantovani, Italian conductor and composer (d. 1980)
1906 – Curtis LeMay, American general and politician (d. 1990)
1907 – Claus von Stauffenberg, German colonel (d. 1944)
1908 – Carlo Abarth, Italian engineer and businessman, founded Abarth (d. 1979)
1912 – Harald Keres, Estonian physicist and academic (d. 2010)
  1912   – Yi Wu, Japanese-Korean colonel (d. 1945)
1913 – Jack Dyer, Australian footballer and coach (d. 2003)
  1913   – Arthur Haulot, Belgian journalist and poet (d. 2005)
1914 – V. R. Krishna Iyer, Indian lawyer and judge (d. 2014)
1916 – Nita Barrow, Barbadian nurse and politician, 7th Governor-General of Barbados (d. 1995)
  1916   – Bill Melendez, Mexican-American voice actor, animator, director, and producer (d. 2008)
1919 – Carol Bruce, American singer and actress (d. 2007)
  1919   – Joseph Wapner, American judge and television personality (d. 2017)
1920 – Vasilis Diamantopoulos, Greek actor, director, and screenwriter (d. 1999)
1922 – Francis Brunn, German juggler (d. 2004)
  1922   – David Sidney Feingold, American biochemist and academic (d. 2019)
  1922   – Francesco Rosi, Italian director and screenwriter (d. 2015)
1923 – Văn Cao, Vietnamese composer, poet, and painter (d. 1995)
  1923   – Samuel Klein, Polish-Brazilian businessman and philanthropist, founded Casas Bahia (d. 2014)
1924 – Gianni Ferrio, Italian composer and conductor (d. 2013)
1925 – Howard Baker, American lawyer, politician, and diplomat, 12th White House Chief of Staff (d. 2014)
1926 – Thomas Williams, American author and academic (d. 1990)
1927 – Bill Rowling, New Zealand politician, 30th Prime Minister of New Zealand (d. 1995)
1928 – Seldon Powell, American saxophonist and flute player (d. 1997)
  1928   – C. W. McCall, American singer-songwriter and politician (d. 2022)
1929 – Ed Asner, American actor, singer, and producer (d. 2021)
  1929   – Joe Hinton, American singer (d. 1968)
1930 – J. G. Ballard,  English novelist, short story writer, and essayist (d. 2009)
  1930   – Olene Walker, American lawyer and politician, 15th Governor of Utah (d. 2015)
1931 – John Kerr, American actor, singer, and lawyer (d. 2013)
  1931   – Mwai Kibaki, Kenyan economist and politician, 3rd President of Kenya (d. 2022)
  1931   – Pascal Lissouba, Congolese politician, President of the Republic of the Congo (d. 2020)
1932 – Petula Clark, English singer-songwriter and actress
  1932   – Clyde McPhatter, American singer (d. 1972)
  1932   – Alvin Plantinga, American philosopher, author, and academic
1933 – Gloria Foster, American actress (d. 2001)
  1933   – Theodore Roszak, American scholar and author (d. 2011)
1934 – Joanna Barnes, American actress and author (d. 2022)
  1934   – Peter Dickinson, English pianist and composer
1935 – Nera White, American basketball player (d. 2016)
1936 – H. B. Bailey, American race car driver (d. 2003)
  1936   – Wolf Biermann, German singer-songwriter and guitarist
  1936   – Tara Singh Hayer, Indian-Canadian journalist and publisher (d. 1998)
1937 – Little Willie John, American singer-songwriter (d. 1968)
1939 – Terry Bradbury, English footballer and manager
  1939   – Yaphet Kotto, American actor and screenwriter (d. 2021)
  1939   – Rauni-Leena Luukanen-Kilde, Finnish physician and parapsychologist (d. 2015)
1940 – Roberto Cavalli, Italian fashion designer
  1940   – Tony Mendez, American CIA technical operations officer (d. 2019)
  1940   – Ulf Pilgaard, Danish actor and screenwriter
  1940   – Hank Wangford, English singer-songwriter, guitarist, and physician
  1940   – Sam Waterston, American actor
1941 – Rick Kemp, English singer-songwriter, bass player, and producer 
  1941   – Daniel Pinkwater, American author and illustrator
1942 – Daniel Barenboim, Argentinian-Israeli pianist and conductor
1945 – Roger Donaldson, Australian director, producer, and screenwriter
  1945   – Bob Gunton, American actor and singer
  1945   – Anni-Frid Lyngstad, Norwegian-Swedish singer
1946 – Vassilis Goumas, Greek basketball player
1947 – Malcolm Ranjith, Sri Lankan cardinal 
  1947   – Bill Richardson, American politician and diplomat, 21st United States Ambassador to the United Nations
  1947   – Ken Sutcliffe, Australian journalist and sportscaster
1948 – Jimmy Choo, Malaysian fashion designer  
1948 – Teodoro Locsin, Jr., Filipino journalist, lawyer, politician and diplomat
1950 – Egon Vaupel, German lawyer and politician, 16th Mayor of Marburg
1951 – Beverly D'Angelo, American actress, singer, and producer
1952 – Rick Atkinson, American journalist, historian, and author
  1952   – Randy Savage, American wrestler (d. 2011)
1953 – Alexander O'Neal, American R&B singer-songwriter and arranger
  1953   – James Widdoes, American actor, director, and producer
1954 – Kevin S. Bright, American director and producer
  1954   – Emma Dent Coad, British politician
  1954   – Aleksander Kwaśniewski, Polish journalist and politician, 3rd President of Poland
  1954   – Randy Thomas, American singer-songwriter, guitarist, and producer
  1954   – Tony Thompson, American R&B, disco, and rock drummer (d. 2003)
1955 – Joe Leeway, English pop singer-songwriter and percussionist 
1956 – Michael Hampton, American guitarist and producer
1957 – Gerry Connolly, Australian comedian and actor 
  1957   – Kevin Eubanks, American guitarist and composer  
  1957   – Harold Marcuse, American historian and educator
  1957   – Michael Woythe, German footballer and manager
1958 – Lewis Fitz-Gerald, Australian actor and director
  1958   – Gu Kailai, Chinese lawyer and businesswoman
  1958   – Lesley Laird, British politician
1959 – Tibor Fischer, English author
1960 – Dawn Airey, English broadcaster
1961 – Hugh McGahan, New Zealand rugby league player
1962 – Mark Acres, American basketball player and educator
  1962   – Judy Gold, American comedian, actress, and producer
1963 – Andrew Castle, English tennis player and television host
  1963   – Benny Elias, Lebanese-Australian rugby league player and sportscaster
  1963   – Kevin J. O'Connor, American actor
1964 – Stelios Aposporis, Greek footballer and manager
  1964   – Mikhail Rusyayev, Russian footballer, coach, and manager (d. 2011)
  1964   – Tiit Sokk, Estonian basketball player and coach
1965 – Nigel Bond, English snooker player
  1965   – Stefan Pfeiffer, German swimmer
1966 – Rachel True, American actress
1967 – Greg Anthony, American basketball player and sportscaster
  1967   – Cynthia Breazeal, American computer scientist, roboticist, and academic
  1967   – Pedro Borbón, Jr., Dominican baseball player
  1967   – E-40, American rapper and actor
  1967   – Wayne Harrison, English footballer (d. 2013)
  1967   – François Ozon, French director, producer, and screenwriter
  1967   – Gus Poyet, Uruguayan footballer and manager
  1967   – Jon Preston, New Zealand rugby player
1968 – Ol' Dirty Bastard, American rapper and producer (d. 2004)
  1968   – Fausto Brizzi, Italian director, producer, and screenwriter
  1968   – Teodoro Casiño, Filipino journalist and politician
  1968   – Jennifer Charles, American singer-songwriter, guitarist, and producer 
  1968   – Uwe Rösler, German footballer and manager
1970 – Ilija Aračić, Croatian footballer and coach
  1970   – Jack Ingram, American singer-songwriter and guitarist
  1970   – Alexander Kvitashvili, Georgian-Ukrainian academic and politician, 19th Ukrainian Minister of Healthcare
  1970   – Patrick M'Boma, Cameroonian footballer
1971 – Jay Harrington, American actor
  1971   – Martin Pieckenhagen, German footballer
1972 – Jonny Lee Miller, English-American actor
1973 – Sydney Tamiia Poitier, American actress
  1973   – Alamgir Sheriyar, English cricketer
1974 – Chad Kroeger, Canadian singer-songwriter, guitarist, and producer
1975 – Scott Henshall, English fashion designer
  1975   – Yannick Tremblay, Canadian ice hockey player
  1975   – Boris Živković, Croatian footballer
1976 – Brandon DiCamillo, American comedian, actor, and stuntman
  1976   – Virginie Ledoyen, French actress
  1976   – Sule, Indonesian comedian and actor
1977 – Sean Murray, American actor
  1977   – Peter Phillips, English businessman
  1977   – Robaire Smith, American football player
1978 – Floyd Womack, American football player
1979 – Brooks Bollinger, American football player and coach
  1979   – Josemi, Spanish footballer
  1979   – Brett Lancaster, Australian cyclist
1980 – Ace Young, American singer-songwriter and actor
1981 – Drew Hodgdon, American football player
  1981   – Lorena Ochoa, Mexican golfer
1982 – D. J. Fitzpatrick, American football player
  1982   – Rio Hirai, Japanese actress
  1982   – Joe Kowalewski, American football player
  1982   – Benjamin Krause, German rugby player
  1982   – Giaan Rooney, Australian swimmer
  1982   – Lofa Tatupu, American football player
  1982   – Kalu Uche, Nigerian footballer
1983 – Dominic Carroll, Gibraltarian runner
  1983   – Sasha Pavlović, Serbian basketball player
  1983   – Fernando Verdasco, Spanish tennis player
1984 – Asia Kate Dillon, American actor and producer
1985 – Lily Aldridge, American model
  1985   – Charron Fisher, American basketball player
  1985   – Simon Spender, Welsh footballer
1986 – Coye Francies, American football player
  1986   – Sania Mirza, Indian tennis player
  1986   – Jerry Roush, American singer-songwriter 
1987 – Sergio Llull, Spanish basketball player
1988 – Morgan Parra, French rugby player
  1988   – Billy Twelvetrees, English rugby player
1989 – Jonalyn Viray, Filipino singer
1991 – Maxime Colin, French footballer
  1991   – Shailene Woodley, American actress
1992 – Sofia Goggia, Italian skier
  1992   – Minami Minegishi, Japanese singer 
  1992   – Daniela Seguel, Chilean tennis player
  1992   – Trevor Story, American baseball player
  1992   – Kevin Wimmer, Austrian footballer
1993 – Paulo Dybala, Argentine footballer
  1993   – Saaya Irie, Japanese actress and singer
1994 – Ekaterina Alexandrova, Russian tennis player
  1994   – Bryce Cartwright, Australian rugby league player
1995 – Blake Pieroni, American swimmer
  1995   – Karl-Anthony Towns, Dominican-American basketball player
1997 – Paula Badosa, Spanish tennis player
  1997   – Catie Munnings, British rally driver

Deaths

Pre-1600
165 BCE – Mattathias, Jewish resistance leader
 621 – Malo, Breton bishop and saint
 655 – Æthelhere, king of East Anglia
   655   – Penda of Mercia, king of Mercia
1037 – Odo II, French nobleman (b. 983)
1136 – Leopold III, margrave of Austria (b. 1073)
1194 – Margaret I, countess of Flanders
1226 – Frederick of Isenberg, German nobleman (b. 1193)
1280 – Albertus Magnus, German bishop, theologian, and philosopher (b. 1193)
1347 – James I of Urgell, Spanish nobleman (b. 1321)
1351 – Joanna of Pfirt, duchess of Austria
1379 – Otto V, duke of Bavaria
1463 – Giovanni Antonio Del Balzo Orsini, Italian nobleman
1527 – Catherine of York, English princess (b. 1479)
1579 – Ferenc Dávid, Hungarian preacher, founder of the Unitarian Church of Transylvania (b. 1510)

1601–1900
1628 – Roque González de Santa Cruz, Paraguayan missionary and martyr (b. 1576)
1630 – Johannes Kepler, German astronomer and mathematician (b. 1571)
1670 – John Amos Comenius, Czech bishop, philosopher, and educator (b. 1592)
1691 – Aelbert Cuyp, Dutch painter (b. 1620)
1706 – Tsangyang, Tibetan dalai lama (b. 1683)
1712 – James Hamilton, 4th Duke of Hamilton, Scottish general and politician, Lord Lieutenant of Lancashire (b. 1658)
  1712   – Charles Mohun, 4th Baron Mohun, English politician (b. 1675)
1787 – Christoph Willibald Gluck, German composer (b. 1714)
1794 – John Witherspoon, Scottish-American minister and academic (b. 1723)
1795 – Charles-Amédée-Philippe van Loo, French painter (b. 1719)
1832 – Jean-Baptiste Say, French economist and businessman (b. 1767)
1836 – Herman of Alaska, Russian missionary and saint (b. 1750s)
1845 – William Knibb, English Baptist minister and Jamaican missionary (b. 1803)
1853 – Maria II, Portuguese queen and regent (b. 1819)
1892 – Thomas Neill Cream, Scottish-Canadian serial killer (b. 1850)
1897 – Alfred Kennerley, English-Australian politician, 10th Premier of Tasmania (b. 1810)

1901–present
1908 – Cixi, China empress dowager and regent (b. 1835)
1910 – Wilhelm Raabe, German author (b. 1831)
1916 – Henryk Sienkiewicz, Polish journalist and author, Nobel Prize laureate (b. 1846)
1917 – Émile Durkheim, French sociologist, psychologist, and philosopher (b. 1858)
1919 – Mikhail Dolivo-Dobrovolsky, Polish-Russian engineer, electrician, and inventor (b. 1862)
  1919   – Mohammad Farid, Egyptian lawyer and politician (b. 1868)
  1919   – Alfred Werner, French-Swiss chemist and academic, Nobel Prize laureate (b. 1866)
1921 – Tadhg Barry, veteran Irish republican and leading trade unionist (b. 1880)
1922 – Dimitrios Gounaris, Greek lawyer and politician, 94th Prime Minister of Greece (b. 1866)
  1922   – Petros Protopapadakis, Greek mathematician and politician, 107th Prime Minister of Greece (b. 1854)
  1922   – Nikolaos Stratos, Greek lawyer and politician, 106th Prime Minister of Greece (b. 1872)
1941 – Wal Handley, English motorcycle racer (b. 1902)
1945 – Frank Chapman, American ornithologist and photographer (b. 1864)
1949 – Narayan Apte, Indian activist, assassin of Mahatma Gandhi (b. 1911)
  1949   – Nathuram Godse, Indian assassin of Mahatma Gandhi (b. 1910)
1951 – Frank Weston Benson, American painter and educator (b. 1862)
1954 – Lionel Barrymore, American actor, singer, director, and screenwriter (b. 1878)
1956 – Emma Richter, German paleontologist (b. 1888)
1958 – Tyrone Power, American actor, singer, and producer (b. 1914)
1959 – Charles Thomson Rees Wilson, Scottish physicist and meteorologist, Nobel Prize laureate (b. 1869)
1960 – Robert Raymond Cook, Canadian murderer (b. 1937)
1961 – Elsie Ferguson, American actress (b. 1883)
  1961   – Johanna Westerdijk, Dutch pathologist and academic (b. 1883)
1963 – Fritz Reiner, Hungarian-American conductor (b. 1888)
1966 – Dimitrios Tofalos, Greek weightlifter and wrestler (b. 1877)
  1966   – William Zorach, Lithuanian-American sculptor and painter (b. 1887)
1967 – Michael J. Adams, American soldier, pilot, and astronaut (b. 1930)
1970 – Konstantinos Tsaldaris, Egyptian-Greek politician (b. 1884)
1971 – Rudolf Abel, English-Russian colonel (b. 1903)
1976 – Jean Gabin, French actor, singer, and producer (b. 1904)
1978 – Margaret Mead, American anthropologist and author (b. 1901)
1980 – Bill Lee, American actor and singer (b. 1916)
1981 – Steve Macko, American baseball player and coach (b. 1954)
  1981   – Enid Markey, American actress (b. 1894)
  1981   – Khawar Rizvi, Pakistani poet and scholar (b. 1938)
1982 – Vinoba Bhave, Indian philosopher and Gandhian, Bharat Ratna Awardee (b. 1895)
  1982   – Martín de Álzaga, Argentinian race car driver (b. 1901)
1983 – John Grimaldi, English keyboard player and songwriter (b. 1955)
  1983   – Charlie Grimm, American baseball player and manager (b. 1898)
  1983   – John Le Mesurier, English actor (b. 1912)
1985 – Méret Oppenheim, German-Swiss painter, photographer, and poet (b. 1913)
1988 – Billo Frómeta, Dominican conductor and composer (b. 1915)
  1988   – Ieronymos I of Athens, Greek archbishop and theologian (b. 1905)
1994 – Elizabeth George Speare, American author (b. 1908)
1996 – Alger Hiss, American lawyer and diplomat (b. 1904)
1997 – Saul Chaplin, American director and composer (b. 1912)
1998 – Stokely Carmichael, Trinidadian-American activist (b. 1941)
  1998   – Ludvík Daněk, Czech discus thrower (b. 1937)
2000 – Edoardo Agnelli, son of industrialist Gianni Agnelli, converted to Shia Islam (b. 1954)
2003 – Ray Lewis, Canadian runner (b. 1910)
  2003   – Dorothy Loudon, American actress and singer (b. 1925) 
  2003   – Laurence Tisch, American businessman, co-founded the Loews Corporation (b. 1923)
  2003   – Speedy West, American guitarist and producer (b. 1924)
2004 – Elmer L. Andersen, American businessman and politician, 30th Governor of Minnesota (b. 1909)
  2004   – John Morgan, Welsh-Canadian actor and screenwriter (b. 1930)
2005 – Adrian Rogers, American pastor and author (b. 1931)
  2005   – Arto Salminen, Finnish journalist and author (b. 1959)
2006 – David K. Wyatt, American historian and author (b. 1937)
2007 – Joe Nuxhall, American baseball player and sportscaster (b. 1928)
2008 – Grace Hartigan, American painter (b. 1922)
2009 – Serbian Patriarch Pavle II (b. 1914)
2010 – Larry Evans, American chess player and journalist (b. 1932)
  2010   – Ed Kirkpatrick, American baseball player (b. 1944)
  2010   – William Edwin Self, American actor, director, and producer (b. 1921)
2011 – Oba Chandler, American murderer (b. 1946)
2012 – Théophile Abega, Cameroonian footballer and politician (b. 1954)
  2012   – Luís Carreira, Portuguese motorcycle racer (b. 1976)
  2012   – Maleli Kunavore, Fijian rugby player (b. 1983)
  2012   – K. C. Pant, Indian politician, 18th Indian Minister of Defence (b. 1931)
  2012   – Frode Thingnæs, Norwegian trombonist, composer, and conductor (b. 1940)
2013 – Sheila Matthews Allen, American actress and producer (b. 1929)
  2013   – Glafcos Clerides, Cypriot lawyer and politician, 4th President of Cyprus (b. 1919)
  2013   – Mike McCormack, American football player and coach (b. 1930)
2014 – Jack Bridger Chalker, English painter and academic (b. 1918)
  2014   – Lucien Clergue, French photographer and educator (b. 1934)
  2014   – Valéry Mézague, Cameroonian footballer (b. 1983)
  2014   – Reg Withers, Australian soldier and politician, Australian Minister for the Capital Territory (b. 1924)
2015 – Gisèle Prassinos, French author (b. 1920)
  2015   – Herbert Scarf, American economist and academic (b. 1930)
  2015   – Saeed Jaffrey, Indian-British actor (b. 1929)
2016 – Mose Allison, American pianist and songwriter (b. 1927)
2017 – Lil Peep, American singer and rapper (b. 1996)

Holidays and observances
 America Recycles Day (United States)
 Christian feast day:
 Abibus of Edessa
 Albert the Great
 Blessed Caius of Korea
 Didier of Cahors
 Francis Asbury and George Whitefield (Episcopal Church)
 Blessed Hugh Faringdon
 Leopold III, a public holiday in Lower Austria and Vienna.
 Malo
 Mechell
 November 15 (Eastern Orthodox liturgics)
 Day of the German-speaking Community of Belgium (German-speaking Community of Belgium)
 Day of the Imprisoned Writer (International observance)
 Independence Day, unilaterally declared in 1988. (Palestine)
 King's Feast (Belgium)
 National Tree Planting Day (Sri Lanka)
 Peace Day (Ivory Coast)
 Republic Proclamation Day (Brazil)
 Shichi-Go-San (Japan)
 Republic Day (Northern Cyprus)
 The beginning of Winter Lent (Eastern Orthodox)

References

External links

 
 
 

Days of the year
November